"7500 OBO" is a song by American country music singer Tim McGraw. It was released on August 2, 2021, as the third single from his sixteenth studio album Here on Earth. The song was written by Nathan Spicer, Matt McGinn and Jennifer Schott, and produced by Byron Gallimore and McGraw.

Background and content
"7500 OBO" is a song about McGraw's pickup truck that he wants to sell because it, according to Clayton Edwards of Outsider, "holds too many memories. All he can think about when he turns the key is his ex in the passenger seat." Robin Palmer, a chief creative officer of SmackSongs, who passed the song to McGraw, told Billboard: "It tells a story, it's just a really good country song. It happens to have a modern cadence and sort of a modern approach to it." McGraw said that the song "feel[s] like your right wrist hanging over the steering wheel and your elbow hanging off the window kind of thing. It comes back to the car." 7500 refers to the truck's asking price, while the OBO stands for "or best offer".

The song references several of McGraw's singles, more prominently the 1998 number one hit "Where the Green Grass Grows" (in which the fiddle riff of the song is sampled throughout portions of the single). The song also includes references to his other singles "Shotgun Rider" and "Let it Go."

Music video
The music video was released on August 13, 2021, and directed by Alexa and Stephen Kinigopoulos. McGraw's youngest daughter Audrey has her first acting role in the video. It depicts a relationship about "a young woman with a boyfriend who eventually leaves town". The couple's story is shown "from the truck's backseat: sometimes through the windshield, with the couple kissing, dining and even fighting in the front of the cab".

Other versions
On October 8, 2021, McGraw released the track's acoustic version.

Charts

Weekly charts

Year-end charts

Certifications

Release history

References

2021 singles
2021 songs
Tim McGraw songs
Songs written by Matt McGinn (songwriter)
Song recordings produced by Byron Gallimore
Song recordings produced by Tim McGraw
Big Machine Records singles
Songs about cars